Oh, Brother! is a British television sitcom starring Derek Nimmo, which aired on BBC1 from 13 September 1968 to 27 February 1970.

Synopsis
The series was set in the fictional Mountacres Monastery, with Nimmo cast as the well-meaning but inept novice Brother Dominic making life difficult for the Prior (Father Anselm played by Felix Aylmer) and the Master of the Novices (Father Bernard played by Derek Francis).

Nimmo was playing a very similar role in All Gas and Gaiters which ran from 1966 to 1971, the main difference being that Brother Dominic was working-class, whereas Nimmo's previous character, Rev. Mervyn Noote, had been upper-class.

Cast 
Derek Nimmo — Brother Dominic

Felix Aylmer — The Prior, Father Anselm

Patrick McAllinney — Brother Patrick

Derek Francis — Sub Prior, Father Matthew

Edward Malin — Oldest Brother (Series 1-2)

Colin Gordon — Master of Novices, Father Bernard (Series 1)

Geoffrey Hibbert — Brother Francis (Series 1)

Reception
Oh, Brother! was not quite as successful or as affectionately remembered as All Gas and Gaiters, although it did last three series containing 19 episodes, only eight of which exist in the BBC archives.  The comic potential in a monastery may have been rather limited, although it did benefit from a cast which included some experienced actors, particularly Nimmo himself and Felix Aylmer as Father Prior.

Archive status 
Due the BBC's wiping policy at the time, 11 episodes are currently missing from the archives. The episodes that currently survive consist of the 1st series episode The Voice of the Turtle and all the episodes from the 3rd series. Domestic audio recordings have been located from several missing episodes, and in 2020 a short clip from the missing episode In the Beginning was uncovered by Kaleidoscope. The clip featured in the Belgium television show "Ziet u er wat in" (Translation: Do You Like What You See?), which regularly featured short clips from British television programs at the time including the likes of Sherlock Holmes, The Black and White Minstrel Show, The Good Old Days and The Wednesday Play.

Episodes

Series 1 (1968)

Short Insert: Christmas Night With The Stars (1968)
Christmas Night with the Stars was a programme screened annually on Christmas night that ran annually from 1958-1972. The program consisted of appearances from the BBC's top stars of that time, whom appeared in short versions of their programmes, lasting usually between five to ten minutes long. Oh Brother! appeared in a cross-over sketch with the sitcom All Gas and Gaiters where Nimmo also played Rev. Mervyn Noote. In this sketch, Nimmo plays both roles as Noote and Dominic respectively. This sketch no longer exists in the BBC's film and videotape archives.

Series 2 (1969)

Series 3 (1970)

Sequel series
Oh, Brother! was followed by a sequel Oh, Father! in 1973, also starring Nimmo and with the same writers. In this series, Dominic left the monastery and became a Roman Catholic priest.  It had a supporting cast of Laurence Naismith, Pearl Hackney and David Kelly.  This was not a success and only lasted a single series of seven episodes.

DVD release
All the surviving episodes were released on a Region 2 DVD boxset on 8 November 2004. The follow up series Oh, Father! was released on DVD on 24 October 2005.

References

External links

 Oh Brother! at British Comedy Guide

BBC television sitcoms
Lost BBC episodes
1968 British television series debuts
1970 British television series endings
1960s British sitcoms
1970s British sitcoms
English-language television shows
Religious comedy television series